Deli Amin Nazer (also Romanized as Delī Amīn Naz̄er; also known as Delī Rengak, Dolī Pīk, Dolī Rangak, and Dolī Rangak-e Amīn Naz̄ar) is a village in Poshtkuh-e Rostam Rural District, Sorna District, Rostam County, Fars Province, Iran. At the 2006 census, its population was 109, in 17 families.

References 

Populated places in Rostam County